In materials science, Ostwald's rule or Ostwald's step rule, conceived by Wilhelm Ostwald, describes the formation of polymorphs. The rule states that usually the less stable polymorph crystallizes first. Unstable polymorphs more closely resemble the state in solution, and thus are kinetically advantaged.  From hot water, metastable, fibrous crystals of benzamide appear first, later to spontaneously convert to the more stable rhombic polymorph. Another example is magnesium carbonate, which more readily forms dolomite.  A dramatic example is phosphorus, which upon sublimation first forms the less stable white phosphorus, which only slowly polymerizes to the red allotrope. This is notably the case for the anatase polymorph of titanium dioxide, which having a lower surface energy is commonly the first phase to form by crystallisation from amorphous precursors or solutions despite being metastable, with rutile being the equilibrium phase at all temperatures and pressures.  

Ostwald suggested that the solid first formed on crystallisation of a solution or a melt is the least stable polymorph. This can be explained on the basis of irreversible thermodynamics, structural relationships, or a combined consideration of statistical thermodynamics and structural variation with temperature. Ostwald's rule is not a universal law but a common tendency observed in nature.

References

 
Mineralogy
Gemology
Crystallography